Bettendorf is a surname. Notable persons with the surname include:

Joseph W. Bettendorf (1864–1933), American businessman, brother of William
William P. Bettendorf (1854–1910) German-American inventor
Jeff Bettendorf (1960 -  ) Former Major League Baseball pitcher